Appomattox, shorthand for the surrender of Robert E. Lee to Ulysses S. Grant in the American Civil War, may refer to:

Battle of Appomattox Court House, a battle of the American Civil War that was a culmination of the Appomattox Campaign and resulted in the surrender of Robert E. Lee
Appomattox Court House National Historical Park, a National Historical Park in Virginia at the site of the surrender

Appomattox may also refer to:
Appomattox County, Virginia, in the United States
Appomattox, Virginia, a town and the seat of that county
Appomattox Court House (disambiguation), several courthouses in Appomattox, Virginia
Appomattox River, a tributary of the James River in Virginia
 Appomattox Basin, a name for the Tri-Cities, Virginia region
Appomattox Manor, a manor in City Point, Hopewell, Virginia
Battle of Appomattox Station, a battle of the American Civil War in Appomattox, Virginia, a day before the Battle of Appomattox Court House
SS Appomattox, a large American wooden steamship operated mainly on the Great Lakes
SS Appomattox (1893), a British steamship of the early 20th century
Appomattox (opera), a 2007 opera in based on the American Civil War, composed by Philip Glass
Appomattox (statue), a bronze Confederate soldier memorial in Alexandria, Virginia

See also 

Appomattoc (people)